The Alcatel mandatory standstill period is a period of at least ten calendar days following the notification of an award decision in a contract tendered via the Official Journal of the European Union, before the contract is signed with the successful supplier(s). Its purpose is to allow unsuccessful bidders to challenge the decision before the contract is signed. It is named after a pair of linked European Court of Justice cases which are jointly known as the Alcatel case (Case C-81/98). Within the UK, it was introduced by the Office of Government Commerce in 2005 and remains within UK contract award legislation under regulation 87 of the Public Contracts Regulations 2015  and regulation 86 of the Public Contracts (Scotland) Regulations 2015, even though the UK has now withdrawn from the European Union.

The timelines given below are the minimum (of at least 10 days) under the 'Alcatel' mandatory standstill period and show the days by which specific actions by the contracting authority (ie notify all tenderers of the award decision and the completion of any requested additional de-briefing) and by the tenderer (ie a request for additional de-briefing within the standstill period), and in order to comply with the minimum period before entering into a contract (assuming no legal challenges are formally notified).

Notes:
- Depending on the day of the initial notification of the intention of the contract award decision, given the very tight timescales for the additional debriefing, it may be more practical to extend the end-date of the standstill period beyond the minimum of 10 calendar days.

- The 'traditional' de-briefing requirement (within 15 days of receiving a written request) remains where a tenderer does not seek an additional de-briefing within the first 2 working days of the standstill period. In any case, all tenderers can make formal complaints in Court within the standstill period regardless of having requested or received debriefing within the standstill period and Courts can agree to grant interim measures preventing contract award.

Timeline
Action
 Day 0	Notify tenderers of decision and intention to award contract on or after 'date'
 Day 1	
 Day 2	Tenderers must request additional debriefing (by phone, email, fax) before end of day (midnight)
 Day 3	
 Day 4	
 Day 5	
 Day 6	
 Day 7	Additional de-briefings must be completed before end of day (midnight)*
 Day 8	
 Day 9	
 Day 10	End of minimum standstill period**

The contract may be concluded if no legal challenge has been notified.

 If there is a delay in completing the requested additional de-briefings, the end-date of the standstill period must be extended to ensure 3 full working days between the last de-brief and the end of the standstill period remembering that the last day must be a working day.
 The end of a standstill period must not fall on a public holiday or at the weekend. Day 10 ends at midnight on that day.

References

External links
Case C-81/98 Alcatel Austria AG and Others, Siemens AG Österreich and Sag-Schrack Anlagentechnik AG v Bundesministerium für Wissenschaft und Verkehr
Directive 2004/18/EC of the European Parliament and of the Council of 31 March 2004 on the coordination of procedures for the award of public works contracts, public supply contracts and public service contracts
Office of Government Commerce, 10-day Mandatory Standstill Period, updated January 2008

European Union law
Government procurement